Warrell is a surname. Notable people with the surname include:
 Charles Warrell (1889–1995), English schoolteacher
 Lincoln Warrell, founder of The Warrell Corporation

See also
 Worrell